The Valentin submarine factory is a protective shelter on the Weser River at the Bremen suburb of , built to protect German U-boats during World War II. The factory was under construction from 1943 to March 1945 using forced labour, but was damaged by air-raids and unfinished by the end of the war. The Valentin factory was the largest fortified U-boat facility in Germany, and was second only to those built at Brest in France.

As a manufacturing facility, it differed from conventional U-boat pens, which were designed to house and service operational U-boats.

Construction

Production of U-boats by German shipyards had been dramatically reduced as a result of bombing by the Royal Air Force and the United States Army Air Forces, necessitating the creation of bomb-proof production sites. Many such sites were in use in 1944, including the U-boat pen Nordsee III on the German island of Helgoland, Fink II and Elbe II in Hamburg and Kilian in Kiel. Other sites in Germany and other occupied countries were under construction or planned, such as Hornisse in Bremen, Elbe XVII and Wenzel in Hamburg, Wespe in Wilhelmshaven, Kaspar in Kiel. Under the codename Valentin a submarine factory was to be built directly on the Weser river between the Bremen suburbs Rekum and Farge. It was intended the facility would be used for the final assembly of Type XXI submarines, starting in April 1945 with three boats and from August 1945 a monthly delivery of a minimum of 14 boats. A second bunker called Valentin II was planned as well.

The roof was constructed using dozens of large, reinforced concrete arches, manufactured on-site and individually lifted into place. Construction required  of concrete.

The design and oversight of the Valentin's construction was carried out by the Organisation Todt. Marineoberbaurat Edo Meiners was in charge overall; the on-site supervising engineer was Erich Lackner. He had a lengthy post-war career, becoming one of Germany's most prominent civil engineers.

By March 1945, the facility was 90% completed and the most of the necessary machine tools had been installed. Production of U-boats was due to begin within two months.

Planned use

After completion, the bunker would have had a work–force of around 4,500 slave workers. Under the management of the Bremer Vulkan shipyard, it would assemble U-boats. Each would be built from eight, large, pre-fabricated sections manufactured in other shipyards such as Bremer Vulkan, Deschimag AG Weser with its bunker Hornisse, Kriegsmarinewerft Wilhelmshaven with bunker Wespe and Deschimag Seebeckwerft in Bremerhaven, and then shipped to Valentin on barges.

The bunker was to house 13 assembly bays (calledTaktplatz in German, or Takt for short), each carrying out one part of the assembly process. Two bays, Takt 9 and Takt 10, were underneath box-like structures on the roof that allowed the extra height needed for the installation of periscopes, snorkels and antennas. The two last bays, Takt 12 and Takt 13, were separated by high walls from the rest of the building and could be closed by water-tight floodgates. The two separated bays could be flooded to give a total water depth of about 20 metres from the bottom of Takt 13's dry dock to the water-surface at the building's roof-level. Takt 13 was to be used for leak–tests of the completed U-boats as well as engine starts and other tests. In addition to the 13 assembly bays, the bunker housed workshops and store-rooms for the prefabricated sections, diesel-engines and batteries, and storage tanks for fuel and lubricants.

The gateway in the western wall could be closed by means of a sliding bomb-proof door which opened to a small canal, a creek and then directly onto the Weser river. Through this, sections of submarine would be delivered by barges and completed submarines could leave.

Operations at Valentin were intended to commence by late 1944, but was postponed to mid-1945 due in part to a combination of manpower and supply shortages and bombing. It is likely that production would have been limited due to the severe quality control problems experienced with the prefabricated sections.  Albert Speer (the Reich armaments minister) had directed that the sections be made by inland companies and then assembled at the shipyards so as to ease production.  However, these companies had little experience in shipbuilding resulting in lengthy re-working to rectify flaws in the sections.  Out of the 118 boats completed, only four were rated fit for combat before the war ended in Europe.

Labour force

Some were housed in the nearby Bremen-Farge concentration camp, the largest subcamp of the Neuengamme concentration camp complex, with 2,092 prisoners as of March 25, 1945. The camp facility was erected close by at a large naval fuel oil storage facility; some prisoners were accommodated in an empty underground fuel tank. Among the labourers were mainly non–German concentration camp inmates (Fremdarbeiter) as well as Russian, Polish, and French prisoners of war, but also some German criminals and political prisoners.

The camp was initially run by the SS, but the expansion of the camp network in the area led to a shortage of personnel. By mid-1944, the camp was commanded by an army captain, Ulrich Wahl, and the prisoners were guarded by a detachment of naval infantry. Only a handful of SS men remained involved in the running of the camp.

Work on the bunker took place around the clock, with personnel forced to work 12-hour shifts from 7am to 7pm. This resulted in a high death rate amongst the prisoners. However, the identity of only 553 victims, mostly Frenchmen, has been confirmed. The total number of deaths may be as high as 6,000 as the names of the Polish and Russian dead were not recorded. The worst work on the site was that of the so-called iron detachments (Eisenkommandos), responsible for the movement of iron and steel girders. A French survivor, Raymond Portefaix, stated that a prisoner's life expectancy fell dramatically on being assigned to one of these detachments. He described the Eisenkommandos as suicide squads.

The prisoners held at the Neuengamme concentration camp and its subcamps were evacuated in April 1945, just before the capture of the area by the British army. Many were placed on board the SS Cap Arcona. This German ship was heavily laden with around 5,000 concentration–camp prisoners when she was attacked and sunk by the RAF on 3 May 1945; only 350 prisoners survived. The sinking took place just one day before the German surrender at Lüneburg Heath, the unconditional surrender of German forces in the Netherlands and North-West Germany.  It is estimated that more than 6,000 workers died during the building of Valentin.

Bombing

The Valentin factory was attacked by the RAF on 27 March 1945. The attacking force consisted of twenty Avro Lancaster heavy bombers of 617 Squadron which had, after the "Dambusters" raid, developed precision bombing methods. Simultaneously, a force of 115 Lancasters bombed the nearby fuel oil storage depot in the village of Schwanewede. The bombers were escorted by ninety RAF North American Mustang fighters of 11 Group

The Lancasters attacking Valentin each carried a single large earthquake bomb – seven carried the 5 ton 'Tallboy', thirteen carried the 10 ton 'Grand Slam'. The explosions blew large holes in the remaining thickness of the roof and brought down around 1,000 tons of debris into the chamber below. Workers who were inside the bunker at the time survived, as the bombs did not penetrate the roof before detonating. Another bomb caused damage to a nearby electricity plant, workshops and a concrete mixing plant.

Three days later, on 30 March, the US Eighth Air Force attacked Valentin with Disney bombs. These were large weapons with hard steel casings, rocket-assisted to increase their penetrating power. Sixty were launched but only one hit the target, causing little damage.  However, considerable damage was done to installations surrounding the bunker.

The factory was abandoned, and four weeks after the bombing, the area was occupied by the British Army's XXX Corps, which captured Bremen after a five-day battle.

Post war

After the war, when the machine tools had been removed, further bombing of Valentin was carried out. Beginning in March 1946, Project Ruby was a joint Anglo-American affair to investigate the use of penetration bombs against heavily protected concrete targets.

The U-boat pen Nordsee III and subterranean bunkers on the island of Heligoland were also selected as targets for this testing. Bombs were carried by Avro Lancasters from No. 15 Squadron RAF and US Boeing B-29 Superfortress and Boeing B-17 Flying Fortress aircraft operating from RAF Marham. Around 140 sorties were flown, testing a range of different bombs.

Because it seemed impossible to destroy Valentin by bombing it, the decision was made to destroy it by blasting. This idea was later abandoned because the blasting would have caused severe damage to the nearby villages of Rekum and Farge including the power-station in Farge. In 1960 the bunker was taken over by the German Navy, for use as a storage depot.

In 1983, a memorial to the workers who built Valentin was erected. Titled Vernichtung durch Arbeit (Extermination through labour), it was by Bremen artist Fritz Stein.

High maintenance costs forced the German Defence Ministry to offer the bunker for sale in 2008. Military use finally came to an end on 31 December 2010. Its custodianship was passed to a group called Denkort Bunker Valentin with the intention of developing it as a museum and a memorial. The group currently offers guided tours of the bunker to the public.

See also
 Bombing of Bremen in World War II
 Forced labour under German rule during World War II

Notes

References

Further reading
 Michèle Callan: Forgotten Hero of Bunker Valentin. Die Geschichte von Harry Callan. Edition Falkenberg: Rotenburg/Wümme 2018
 .
 .
 .
 .
 .

External links

 .
 .
 Panoramas of World War II Landmarks, QuickTime VR, panorama view of the interior of Valentin

German Navy submarine bases
Military history of Germany during World War II
Buildings and structures in Bremen (city)